Donald Hunt may refer to:

 Donald F. Hunt, professor of chemistry and pathology
 Donald Hunt (musician) (1930–2018), English choral conductor
 Donald Hunt (sportswriter), African-American sportswriter
 Donald Hunt, a character in the TV soap opera Coronation Street
 Donald Hunt, a character in the TV series Mission: Impossible